The Latvian telephone numbering plan is a telephone number assigning system used in Latvia. All the numbers consist of 8 digits with exceptions for special services. The assigning process is controlled by the Electronic Communications Office and regulated by the Public Utilities Commission.

Format 
The Latvian SSR had the  area code. The original format was 8 (013) xxx xxxx. In 1993, Latvia switched to the +371 code. The plan remained relatively the same until 2008, when a 6 was prepended to all landlines.

Example number in Riga:

 pre-1993: 8 (013) 678 9012
 1993-2008: 678 9012
 2008–present: 6678 9012

Mobile telephones 

 2xх xx xxx—mobile phones.

Geographic numbering 

 5 xx xxxxx, 6 xx xxxxx, 7 xx xxxxx—landlines and other location-based numbers.

The 5-series is currently only reserved for future use. The 6-series is generally used for landlines and the 7-series is used with payphones throughout the country.

Services 

A variety of service numbers are assigned in the 1-series with lengths shorter than the standard 8 digits. Some of these services also provide 8-digit geographical numbers to be reachable from abroad.

Emergency 

 112 — Fire brigade, rescue services, civil protection (also general emergency number);
 110 — Police;
 113 — Ambulance;
 114 — Gas emergency;
 115 — Coast Guard

Calls to 112 are answered on average within 6 seconds and are answered in Latvian, English and Russian. In 98% of cases, the operator can detect the location of the caller within a minute.

Various client services

Toll-free services 

 80x0xxxx—toll-free services.

Shared-cost services 

 810xxxxx—shared-cost services.

Premium rate services 

 88xx, 89xx, 82xxx, 90x0xxxx—premium-rate services.

References

External links 

 Public Utilities Commission
 Electronic Communications Office - Numbering database
 Numuri.lv

Latvia
Telephone numbers
Telephone numbers